Humbertium is a genus of land planarians of the subfamily Bipaliinae (hammerhead flatworms).

Description 
Species of Humbertium are characterized by the presence of a well developed penis papilla in the copulatory apparatus, similar to the one in Bipalium, but with the ovovitelloducts entering the female atrium anteriorly and not posteriorly as in Bipalium.

Etymology 
The genus Humbertium is named after the Swiss naturalist Aloïs Humbert who described several species from Sri Lanka that are now classified in the genus.

Species 
The genus Humbertium contains the following species:

Humbertium core (de Beauchamp, 1930)
Humbertium covidum Justine, Gastineau, Gros, Gey, Ruzzier, Charles & Winsor, 2022
Humbertium depressum (Ritter-Záhony, 1905)
Humbertium diana (Humbert, 1862)
Humbertium dodabettae (de Beauchamp, 1930)
Humbertium ferruginoideum (Sabussowa, 1925)
Humbertium kelleri (von Graff, 1899)
Humbertium longicanale (Sabussowa, 1925)
Humbertium palnisium (de Beauchamp, 1930)
Humbertium penangense (Kawakatsu, 1986)
Humbertium penrissenense (de Beauchamp, 1925)
Humbertium phebe (Humbert, 1862)
Humbertium proserpina (Humbert, 1862)
Humbertium pseudophallicum (de Beauchamp, 1925)
Humbertium ravenalae (von Graff, 1899)
Humbertium subboreale (Sabussowa, 1925)
Humbertium umbrinum (Geba, 1909)
Humbertium voigti (von Graff, 1899)
Humbertium woodworthi (von Graff, 1899)

References 

Geoplanidae
Rhabditophora genera